Thomas A. Alexander (1800 – March 29, 1866) was the fourth mayor of Jersey City in New Jersey. He succeeded Dudley S. Gregory. He served a single one-year term from April 1842 to April 1843. He was succeeded by Peter Bentley, Sr.

Biography
Born in Pennsylvania, he moved to Harsimus (now a section of Jersey City). Outside of his term as mayor, he worked as an insurance underwriter. He died in Bergen Township (now a part of Jersey City) at age 67. The funeral was held at St. Matthew's Episcopal Church in Jersey City.

References

1800 births
1866 deaths
Mayors of Jersey City, New Jersey
19th-century American politicians